Magdalen College School, Brackley, in Northamptonshire, is one of three ancient "Magdalen College Schools", the others being Magdalen College School in Oxford, and Wainfleet All Saints in Lincolnshire, all associated with  Magdalen College, Oxford and its founder William Waynflete, Bishop of Winchester. Located in the town of Brackley, the school occupies two sites: Waynflete site and St John's site (see history section). The Waynfleye site was formerly a Secondary Modern school. This site accommodates most of the secondary school students' lessons, after which students transfer to the St John's site (the site of the old Magdalen College School before the two schools were merged) for more of their lessons during the Sixth Form. Today the school has approximately 1,500 students, and averages 59% A*–C at GCSE

Previously a boys' grammar school, then a voluntary controlled comprehensive school, it converted to academy status in January 2013. The St John's site is still owned by Magdalen College, Oxford, and they are represented on the governing body, but Magdalen (Brackley) had to lease the site from the Oxford college for 999 years to become an academy.

History
The site now occupied by the school was originally the Hospital of St. James and St. John, founded around 1150 by Robert le Bossu, Earl of Leicester. In 1484 it was given to Magdalen College, Oxford. By 1548 there was a school at the site, its initial purpose being to allow pupils of the college in Oxford to escape the plague affecting the city at the time.

In September 1973 MCS merged with the Girls Grammar School (Brackley High) and Brackley Secondary Modern School to form a new comprehensive school on two sites, while the girls' school was converted into the new Southfield Primary school. This school has approximately 1500 students

Chapel
Formerly a chapel for the hospital of St. James and St. John, the earliest datable parts are late-12th century, although many parts are 13th century.  The chapel underwent a major restoration between 1869 and 1870 by Buckeridge.

It is constructed of stone rubble and is one of the largest school chapels, and the oldest school chapel still in use in England. It remains in regular use by the school, Church of England and local community.

Head teachers
1548–1552 – Thomas Godwin
1552–1558 – Robert Bede
1571–1576 – John Bede
1576–1588 – Roger Webster
1588 – Laurence Humphreys
1653 – Mr Perkins
1675–1687 – John Gibbs
1692–1715 – Rev. Thomas Yeomans 
1715–1721 – Moses Loveday
1721–1752 – Richard Cooper
1765–1777 – Rev. John Young
1777–1784 – William Bannister
1784–1821 – Thomas Bannister
1821–1825 – Mr Walker
1826–1856 – Thomas Hawkins
1860–1864 – Rev. F. B. Falkner
1864–1870 – Rev. Thomas Russell
1871–1879 – Rev. Frank Taylor
1879–1882 – Rev. John William Boyd
1882–1899 – Rev. Isaac Wodhams
1900–1910 – Rev. William Holdgate
1910–1929 – Rev. Robert Forster Ashwin
1930–1936 – A.H.B. Bishop
1937–1952 – Rev. A Bolton
1952–1973 – Eric G. Forrester
1973–1993 – Keith Marsh
1993–2006 – Elaine Wotherspoon
2006–present – Ian Colling

Notable former pupils

Notable former pupils include:

 Robert Addie, actor 
 Meyrick Chapman, 1908 Olympic athlete (100m)
 Sir John Coles, Principal Private Secretary to the Prime Minister, Mrs. Margaret Thatcher, 1981–1984; British Ambassador to Jordan, 1984–1988; British High Commissioner to Australia, 1988–1991; Head of the British Diplomatic Service (Permanent Secretary, Foreign and Commonwealth Office) 1994–7. 
 Michael Dudley, circuit judge
 Robin Dunbar, evolutionary psychologist
 Michael Ipgrave, Anglican bishop
 Allan Leighton, former Chief Executive Officer, Asda Group, and former Chairman, Royal Mail Group
 Anna Reynolds, playwright

External links

School official Site
Alumni and Old Brackleians Society
Chapel history and photographs

Secondary schools in West Northamptonshire District
1548 establishments in England
Educational institutions established in the 1540s
Academies in West Northamptonshire District
 
Brackley